is an arcade-style racing video game that is sponsored by Michael Andretti. It was released exclusively for the SNES in North America and Japan.

Gameplay
The game features Champ Car (now called IndyCar) action. There are many modes of play including single race, season mode, and the option to disable the sound and/or music. The season mode consists of 16 tracks. One or two players can join in on the action.

Prior to each race, the player is given the option to adjust tire pressure, down force, and gear ratio. Higher tire pressure reduces grip on the road but increases acceleration and top speed. Higher down force does the reverse. Higher gear ratio increases top speed but reduces acceleration.

Each track features its own hints in a section called "Michael's Advice". The game is roughly based on the 1994 CART World Series season and the viewpoint is from a third-person perspective.

Reception
In their review, GamePro described the game as solidly designed, with an excellent sensation of speed, meticulous recreation of real life racing tracks, and an impressive replay feature with multiple camera views. However, they opined that the inability to make other cars crash leaves the game devoid of drama. The two sports reviewers of Electronic Gaming Monthly gave it scores of 91% and 82%, praising the graphics, sounds, and playability.

References

1994 video games
Blue Planet Software games
Genki (company) games
Champ Car video games
Racing video games set in the United States
Super Nintendo Entertainment System games
Super Nintendo Entertainment System-only games
Video games developed in Japan
Video games set in 1994
Video games set in Canada
Video games based on real people
Andretti
Andretti